In homotopy theory, a branch of mathematics, the Barratt–Priddy theorem (also referred to as Barratt–Priddy–Quillen theorem) expresses a connection between the homology of the symmetric groups and mapping spaces of spheres. The theorem (named after Michael Barratt, Stewart Priddy, and Daniel Quillen) is also often stated as a relation between the sphere spectrum and the classifying spaces of the symmetric groups via Quillen's plus construction.

Statement of the theorem

The mapping space  is the topological space of all continuous maps  from the -dimensional sphere  to itself, under the topology of uniform convergence (a special case of the compact-open topology). These maps are required to fix a basepoint , satisfying , and to have degree 0; this guarantees that the mapping space is connected. The Barratt–Priddy theorem expresses a relation between the homology of these mapping spaces and the homology of the symmetric groups .

This is an instance of homological stability.

This isomorphism holds with integral coefficients (in fact with any coefficients, as is made clear in the reformulation below).

Example: first homology

This isomorphism can be seen explicitly for the first homology . The first homology of a group is the largest commutative quotient of that group. For the permutation groups , the only commutative quotient is given by the sign of a permutation, taking values in }. This shows that , the cyclic group of order 2, for all . (For ,  is the trivial group, so .)

It follows from the theory of covering spaces that the mapping space  of the circle  is contractible, so
. For the 2-sphere , the first homotopy group and first homology group of the mapping space are both infinite cyclic:
. 

A generator for this group can be built from the Hopf fibration . Finally, once , both are cyclic of order 2:
.

Reformulation of the theorem
.
The classifying space of this group is denoted , and its homology of this space is the group homology of : 
.

We similarly denote by  the union of the mapping spaces  under the inclusions induced by suspension.

An equivalent formulation of the Barratt–Priddy theorem is that  is a homology equivalence (or acyclic map), meaning that  induces an isomorphism on all homology groups with any local coefficient system.

Relation with Quillen's plus construction
(Since , the map  satisfies the universal property of the plus construction once it is known that  is a homology equivalence.)

Therefore the Barratt–Priddy theorem can also be stated as

 or

"K-theory of F1"

The Barratt–Priddy theorem is sometimes colloquially rephrased as saying that "the K-groups of F1 are the stable homotopy groups of spheres". This is not a meaningful mathematical statement, but a metaphor expressing an analogy with algebraic K-theory.

The "field with one element" F1 is not a mathematical object; it refers to a collection of analogies between algebra and combinatorics. One central analogy is the idea that  should be the symmetric group .
The higher K-groups  of a ring R can be defined as

References
 
 

Theorems in homotopy theory